Cyclophorus aurantiacus is a species of gastropod belonging to the family Cyclophoridae.

The species is found in Southeastern Asia.

Subspecies:
 Cyclophorus aurantiacus pernobilis (Gould, 1843)

References

Cyclophoridae
Gastropods of Asia
Gastropods described in 1817